Dunham is a city in the Canadian province of Quebec, located in Brome-Missisquoi Regional County Municipality. The population as of the Canada 2011 Census was 3,471.

It is bordered by Saint-Ignace-de-Stanbridge and Stanbridge East to the west, Farnham to the northwest, Brigham and Cowansville to the north, Brome Lake to the northeast, Sutton to the east and Frelighsburg to the south. Selby Lake is located entirely within Dunham.

Demographics 

See also
 List of cities in Quebec

References

External links
 Ville de Dunham

Cities and towns in Quebec
Incorporated places in Brome-Missisquoi Regional County Municipality